Protilema montanum is a species of beetle in the family Cerambycidae. It was described by Kriesche in 1923.

References

Morimopsini
Beetles described in 1923